The Calendar is a 1929 play by the British writer Edgar Wallace. It is a crime thriller set in the world of horse racing world, the sport being among Wallace's interests. The protagonist is a financially struggling racehorse owner with a shady reputation. It premiered at the Palace Theatre in Manchester before transferring to Wyndham's Theatre in the West End.

It was revived for a 42 performance run at the Lyceum Theatre the following year. That year Wallace also adapted it into a novel of the same title.

Film adaptations
The tale was adapted for a 1931 film of the same title starring Edna Best and Herbert Marshall. A remake under the same name was released in 1948 with Greta Gynt and John McCallum in the lead roles. Both versions were productions of Gainsborough Pictures.

References

Bibliography
 Kabatchnik, Amnon. Blood on the Stage, 1975-2000: Milestone Plays of Crime, Mystery, and Detection : an Annotated Repertoire. Rowman & Littlefield, 2012.
 Wearing, J. P. The London Stage 1930–1939: A Calendar of Productions, Performers, and Personnel.  Rowman & Littlefield, 2014.

1929 plays
British plays adapted into films
Plays by Edgar Wallace
Plays set in England
West End plays